Herur  is a village in the southern state of Karnataka, India. It is located in the Gangawati taluk of Koppal district in Karnataka.

Demographics
As of 2001 India census, Herur had a population of 5260 with 2672 males and 2588 females.

See also
 Koppal
 Districts of Karnataka

References

External links
 http://Koppal.nic.in/

Villages in Koppal district